Doris Jessie Carter,  (5 January 1912 – 28 July 1999) was an Australian military officer, public servant, and athlete who specialised in the high jump. She was the first Australian female track and field athlete to make an Olympic Games final.

Carter placed 6th in the 1936 Olympics in Berlin and also competed in the 1938 British Empire Games in Sydney. She won five National Championships at high jump (1933, 1935, 1936, 1938, 1940) and two at discus throw (1936, 1940) in her career.

Following her competitive career, Carter became involved in the administration of women's athletics both at State and National levels. She was President of the Victorian Womens Amateur Athletic Association from 1945 to 1948. Carter also served twice as President of the Australian Women's Amateur Athletic Union, firstly in 1948 and again between 1952 and 1962.

In 1956 Carter was the Assistant Manager to the Australian Olympic Team during the Melbourne Olympic Games.

Carter was also prominent with the Women's Auxiliary Australian Air Force during the Second World War and, on the raising of the Women's Royal Australian Air Force in 1951, she was appointed the service's director. She retired from the post in 1960. Carter co-lead the Anzac Day Parade at Melbourne in the mid-1990s.

See also
 Australian athletics champions (Women)

References
 Athletics Australia Profile

External links
 
 
 
 
 

1912 births
1999 deaths
Athletes (track and field) at the 1936 Summer Olympics
Athletes (track and field) at the 1938 British Empire Games
Australian female high jumpers
Australian female discus throwers
Royal Australian Air Force personnel of World War II
Australian Officers of the Order of the British Empire
Commonwealth Games competitors for Australia
Olympic athletes of Australia
Women in the Australian military
Royal Australian Air Force officers
20th-century Australian women